The Penfold Tournament was a golf tournament on the British PGA tournament circuit. Since the circuit later evolved into the European Tour, the tournament is recognised as an official European Tour event from 1972. It was played between 1932 and 1935, and from 1946 to 1974 at a variety of courses in the United Kingdom. The tournament was sponsored by Penfold Golf and was often played at coastal resorts, whose councils shared the costs. In 1974, Penfold were taken over by Colgate-Palmolive and continued their sponsorship through the Penfold PGA Championship from 1975 to 1977.

It was generally played as an individual stroke play event. In 1949 there were two qualifying rounds, after which the leading 32 were drawn into 16 pairs, who then played four rounds of knock-out foursomes match play to determine the winning pair. In 1950, it was played at mixed-team match play. 32 professional men and 32 ladies qualified over 36 holes and were then drawn into pairs. These pairs played five rounds of knock-out foursomes match play to determine the winning pair, the final being over 36 holes. It returned to an individual stroke play format for 1951. From 1952 to 1954, it was played at 36 holes of stroke play followed by match play for the top 32 players.

In 1955 Penfold combined their sponsorship with Swallow Raincoats who had supported the Swallow-Harrogate Tournament in 1953 and 1954. The new tournament was known as the Swallow-Penfold Tournament and had a first prize of £1,000 and total prize money of £4,000. The new event had a 72-hole stroke play format. Swallow dropped their sponsorship after the 1966 event but the tournament continued with £4,000 prize money in 1967. Prize money increased to £8,000 in 1971 and finally £12,000 in 1974.

Winners

References

External links
Coverage on the European Tour's official site – 1972–74
Results on where2golf.com
History of Penfold Golf

Former European Tour events
Golf tournaments in the United Kingdom
Recurring sporting events established in 1932
Recurring sporting events disestablished in 1974
1932 establishments in Wales
1974 disestablishments in the United Kingdom